Michael Pritchett is an American author best known for his novel The Melancholy Fate of Capt. Lewis.  Pritchett teaches at the University of Missouri in Kansas City.  He is a graduate of the University of Missouri and holds a Masters of Fine Arts in creative writing from Warren Wilson College. He won a Dana Award in 2000.

His fiction has been anthologized in well-known journals, including Passages North, Natural Bridge and New Letters.

Published works

References

Ron Charles, Washington Post review 11/4/07.

21st-century American novelists
American male novelists
Living people
University of Missouri alumni
21st-century American male writers
Year of birth missing (living people)